Middle Road is a road that may refer to

Middle Road, Hong Kong, in Tsim Sha Tsui, Kowloon, Hong Kong
Middle Road, Singapore
The Middle Road, Canada, which was renamed as part of the Queen Elizabeth Way in 1939
 Middle Road (Suffolk County), a road in Long Island, New York signed as Suffolk County Road 48

Music 
Middle of the Road (band), Scottish pop group.

See also
"Middle Road", debut single from former The Stone Roses guitarist Aziz Ibrahim released on No Label Records in 2000
Adult Contemporary (chart)